The Société d'Études pour la Propulsion par Réaction (SEPR) (in ) was a French research and manufacturing company founded in 1944 which specialised in the development of liquid-fuelled rocket engines during the 1950s, 60s, 70s and 80s.

The SEPR 841 is a liquid-fuelled rocket engine used as an auxiliary power unit for the Dassault Mirage III mixed-power high-altitude interceptor aircraft of the 1960s. The engine was one of several similar developed by SEPR.

Mixed-power 
In the 1950s, there was much concern in Western Europe about attacks by fleets of high-flying bombers, such as the Tu-95 Bear. These pre-dated the development of either practical afterburners or surface-to-air missiles and so means to improve the performance of conventional aircraft were sought. Particularly in France, and to some extent in the UK, mixed-power interceptor aircraft were studied, with a combination of jet and rocket power. The rocket would be used for performance at high altitude, increasing either speed or ceiling.

French studies for mixed-power interceptors began in 1948. By 1953 the SNCASO Trident aircraft was flying. This was an unusual design, with a single three-chambered SEPR rocket engine as the main engine, assisted for take-off and low altitude flight by two Turbomeca Marboré turbojets. The Trident was difficult to handle on the low-powered turbojets alone and was thirsty for fuel on rocket power. This primary use of the rocket was not repeated in the future: later aircraft would be jet-powered, with the rocket reserved for high-speed dashes. Later rockets would also be considerably less powerful than the Trident's SEPR 48–1.

A development for the Trident II aircraft was the two chamber SEPR 631 engine. The two chambers could be fired separately. Although not throttleable, this did give a half-thrust setting.

Mirage 

The Mirage and its distinctive delta wing planform began with the prototype MD.550 Mystère-Delta. This bore little relation, other than its name, to the Dassault Mystère; France's swept-wing fighter of the period. The delta aircraft was smaller, around two thirds of the Mystère's weight and was powered by two small Viper turbojets and the SEPR 66 rocket. All three of these engines barely exceeded the thrust of the Mystère's ATAR 101D, although they also only weighed about half of the ATAR.

Mirage IIIC 
The Mirage III adopted the more developed and afterburning ATAR 9. As the delta wing considerably increased the supersonic capacity of the aircraft, rocket power was retained. This was the first European aircraft to exceed Mach 2 in level flight.

It was recognised that most mission profiles did not require the rocket and could not afford its fuel consumption. The original goal of intercepting high-flying bombers also seemed to be receding in favour of missiles, for both offence and defence. The Mirage's rocket was thus mounted as a removable pod which could be replaced with a  jet fuel tank for additional range. Only the high altitude interception would still use it.

To retain balance as rocket fuel was consumed, the rocket pack was in two parts. The  nitric acid oxidiser tank was mounted directly ahead of the rocket engine. A smaller  TX2 Furaline fuel tank was mounted in the front bay just behind the cockpit, replacing the cannon pack. When in the rocket-powered interceptor role, the aircraft would only be armed with missiles.

The rocket pack could be swapped in around 20 minutes by removing six bolts. Fuelling the rocket oxidiser was potentially somewhat hazardous and so it was carried out away from other aircraft, by groundcrew in protective clothing and with a fire crew standing by in order to flush away any spillage. Acid refuelling was carried out above a steel drip tray, with the acid flow and tank vent return through closed pipework with a sightglass to observe full tanks.

Performance in training sorties achieved Mach 1.4 without the rocket and 1.8 with. A typical training sortie duration of 45 minutes would be reduced to under 30, with high Mach and rocket use.

Auxiliary rocket engines 
SEPR's auxiliary rocket engines were based on hypergolic fuel chemistry of 98.5% nitric acid (HNO3) oxidiser with furfuryl alcohol as a fuel, in the ratio of 2.4:1. Later fuels were a mixture of 41% furfuryl alcohol, 41% xylidine and 18% methyl alcohol, or furaline (C13H12N2O; 2-(5-phenylfuran-2-yl)-4,5-dihydro-1H-imidazole )

Unusually, the turbopumps for some of SEPR's engine were mechanically driven from outside. A mechanical drive shaft from the accessory drive of the main turbojet provided the  needed at 5,070 rpm, provided that the engine was running at full speed. As the propellants are hypergolic, the engine can be ignited repeatedly simply by engaging the clutch drive to the pump.

The engine's single combustion chamber was regeneratively cooled by the acid oxidiser.

SEPR 841 
The 841 used TX2 (triethylamine xylidine) as a fuel.

The engine was designed for simplicity and reliability, rather than sophisticated control. The pilot's only control was a simple on/off switch, with the valves and pump then controlled by an electromechanical timer. Power for actuating the main valves was then obtained by a compressed air bottle or fuel pressure.

The tanks were air pressurised, the fuel tank by engine compressor bleed air and the oxidiser tank by ram air and additionally by the stored air bottle. Ram air was taken from the supersonic inlet boundary layer bleeds. A single timer-controlled valve opened the stored air supply which then opened the pneumatic LP cocks. A second valve, after a delay, engaged the turbopump clutch. HP cocks were opened by a single hydraulic piston, driven by fuel pressure controlled through a third timed valve. Both fuel and oxidiser first flowed through a small pilot valve for ignition, before their main valves opened. Correct opening of all four valves was monitored by the timer control, to ensure a safe mixture.

A dump valve system was provided for any residual acid. Oxidiser loaded was burned in flight before landing, or dumped.

Bulk production of the engines was carried out by Hispano-Suiza.

SEPR 844 
For simplicity of fuel supply, the TX2 fuel of the SEPR 84-1 was replaced with standard jet TR-0 kerosene as the SEPR 84–4. This required a few changes to the engine.

For reliable hypergolic ignition, a small TX tank was retained to supply the engine's pilot ignition valve. This fuel supply was controlled very simply, by displacement under fuel pressure acting on a piston in the tank. TX capacity limited the engine to just two or three starts per flight.

The forward bay tank could also be used as an additional fuel tank for the main jet engine. The main tankage could not though supply the rocket. Replacing both rocket and cannon with the fuel tanks gave additional ferry range.

See also 
 Aircraft
 Saunders-Roe SR.53
 Engines
 Napier Scorpion

References 

Aircraft rocket engines
Rocket engines using hypergolic propellant
Research institutes in France